William Albert Gilbert (born 10 November 1959) is an English former footballer, born in Lewisham, London, who made more than 400 appearances in the Football League playing as a defender for Crystal Palace, Portsmouth, Colchester United and Maidstone United. He won 11 caps for England at under-21 level.

Career

Gilbert began his career at Terry Venables' Crystal Palace, winning the FA Youth Cup twice as part of the so-called "Team of the Eighties" as well as being a key fixture in the side that won promotion to the First Division. Gilbert remained with Palace after their relegation back to the Second Division, winning the 1984 Player of the Year award in his final season at Selhurst Park.

Gilbert then moved to Portsmouth, spending five years at Fratton Park before moving on again to Colchester United. He also spent a season at Maidstone United, before playing non-league football for Havant Town, Whyteleafe and Waterlooville. He managed Waterlooville for a time, then after their merger with Havant Town to form Havant & Waterlooville, he became player-manager of the merged club, leading them to the Southern League Southern Division title in his first season, before departing in 2000.

Honours

Club
Crystal Palace
 Football League Second Division Winner (1): 1978–79
 FA Youth Cup Winner (2): 1976–77, 1977–78

Portsmouth
 Football League Second Division Runner-up (1): 1986–87

Individual
 PFA Team of the Year (1): 1984–85
 Crystal Palace Player of the Year (1): 1984

References

External links

1959 births
Living people
Footballers from Lewisham
English footballers
England under-21 international footballers
Association football defenders
Crystal Palace F.C. players
Portsmouth F.C. players
Colchester United F.C. players
Maidstone United F.C. (1897) players
Havant Town F.C. players
Whyteleafe F.C. players
Waterlooville F.C. players
Havant & Waterlooville F.C. players
Havant & Waterlooville F.C. managers
English Football League players
Southern Football League players
English football managers
Waterlooville F.C. managers